Satpara sar Lake is a natural lake near Skardu, Gilgit-Baltistan, Pakistan, which supplies water to Skardu Valley. It is fed by the Satpara Stream.

Satpara Lake is situated at an elevation of 2,636 meters (8,650 ft) above sea level and is spread over an area of 2.5 km².

The completion of Satpara Dam downstream of the lake has enlarged the size of Satpara Lake.

Physical Features 
 The melting ice of the Deosai plains are main source of water for the lake.
 The lake is centered with an area of 2.5 km with a picturesque island.

See also
 Satpara Dam
 Satpara Stream
 Gilgit-Baltistan

References

External links
 Photos from Satpara Lake by Waqas Usman
- Imran Ahmed's Photo Gallery

Lakes of Gilgit-Baltistan